"Tiger Man (King of the Jungle)" is a song written by Joe Hill Louis and Sam Phillips (credited as Sam Burns). It was recorded for Sun Records by Rufus Thomas, Jr. in June 1953 and released as a single in July 1953.

The song was notably covered by Elvis Presley for his '68 Comeback Special. Another live version was featured in his 1970 concert film Elvis: That's the Way It Is and the accompanying album That's the Way It Is.

History 
Rufus Thomas recorded the song for Sun Records on June 30, 1953. On July 8, 1953, his recording was released as a single, with "Save That Money" on the opposite side.

References 

1953 songs
1953 singles
Rufus Thomas songs
Elvis Presley songs
Songs written by Joe Hill Louis
Songs written by Sam Phillips